Nola Ann Nāhulu (born November 3, 1954) is a Hawaiian choral conductor.  She is the artistic director of the Hawaii Youth Opera Chorus (HYOC), as well as the Kawaiahao Church Choir, Kawaiolaonāpukanileo, an a cappella Hawaiian choral ensemble, and others.  She is a teacher and lecturer at UH Mānoa.  Additionally, she runs Bette Muumuu, a dress manufacturer in Hawaii.  Nola Nāhulu is a graduate of Kamehameha Schools.

Career
Nāhulu studied at Whitman College and the University of Hawaii at Manoa, receiving a master's degree in music education. She has served as the executive director for HYOC since 1986. With HYOC, Nahulu has directed many festivals in Hawaii, such as the Na Leo Pili Mai Choral Festival and E Mele Kākou Children's Choral Festival. She also participates in the annual Pacific Rim Children's Chorus Festival every summer, and assists with the Hawaiian pieces, considered a staple of the festival.

References

American music educators
Women conductors (music)
1954 births
Kamehameha Schools alumni
Living people
21st-century American conductors (music)
Women music educators
21st-century American women musicians